Vijessna Ferkic (born April 28, 1987, near Hamburg, West Germany) is a German-American actress, visual artist and writer.

Biography 
Ferkic was born and raised in a small town near Hamburg.

At the age of 10 she was accepted into one of the first acting schools in Hamburg. Shortly after that Ferkic was chosen to star in the series Die Pfefferkörner (1998-2001). Ferkic subsequently had several guest roles on established television series and movie productions. Ferkic was chosen to play Sophie in The Reader directed by Stephen Daldry as well as Sarah in Beats Being Dead by Christian Petzold.

Filmography & Television

References

External links 
 
 

1987 births
Living people
Actresses from Hamburg
German child actresses
German film actresses
German people of Croatian descent
German television actresses